This is a list of the European Hot 100 Singles and European Top 100 Albums number ones of 1985, as published by Eurotipsheet magazine (renamed Music & Media in April 1986).

Chart history

Notes

References

Europe
1985
1985